Ester Henning (1887–1985) was a Swedish artist. From 1919 she spent the remaining 60 years of her life in a mental institution.

Her art has been exhibited at three main exhibitions: in 1946 in Gothenburg, in 1963 at the
Beckomberga Hospital and in 1970 at the Liljevalch Art Gallery in Stockholm. 

In 2009 Maud Nycander and Kersti Grunditz made a documentary about her life and her art that was shown on Sveriges Television.

References 
 , ¨Doctoral dissertation, University of Gothenburg, Sweden.
Art exhibition information
Synopsis for the TV show
Thesis abstract about Ester Henning

Further reading 
 

1887 births
1985 deaths
Swedish artists